The Scaled Composites Model 351 Stratolaunch or Roc is an aircraft built by Scaled Composites for Stratolaunch Systems to carry air-launch-to-orbit (ALTO) rockets. It was announced in December 2011, rolled out in May 2017, and flew the first time on April 13, 2019. The Stratolaunch is intended to carry a  payload and has a  maximum takeoff weight.

The company ceased operations in May 2019, shortly after the first flight, and placed all company assets, including the aircraft, for sale by June 2019. In October 2019, Cerberus Capital Management acquired Stratolaunch Systems, including the Stratolaunch aircraft. Stratolaunch announced in December 2019 that it would now be focusing on offering high-speed flight test services. , the Stratolaunch has flown nine times.

History

Early development 

In early 2011, Dynetics began studying the project and had approximately 40 employees working on it at the December 2011 public announcement. Stratolaunch originally planned to airlaunch the Falcon 9 Air by SpaceX, whose efforts began shortly before December. Launching medium-sized payloads with the Falcon 9 dictated the aircraft size but SpaceX departed a year later.

In May 2012, its specially constructed hangar was being built at the Mojave Air and Space Port in Mojave, California. In October 2012, the first of two manufacturing buildings, a  facility for construction of the composite sections of the wing and fuselage, was opened for production.

In August 2013, the Pegasus II was selected for the air-launch vehicle.  In August 2014, all solid-fuel propulsion was selected, rather than liquid-fuel for the Orbital Sciences launcher.  In August 2015,  of structure was assembled.

By June 2016, Scaled Composites had 300 people working on the project. Virgin Galactic also plans to launch small satellites with the LauncherOne from a 747. Orbital ATK dropped its Thunderbolt rocket project for medium-class payloads. In October 2016, the Pegasus II was replaced by multiple Pegasus XL mounted underneath the carrier aircraft, developments of the original Pegasus rocket which had been launched 42 times since 1990.

Testing 

By May 1, 2017, Stratolaunch had already spent hundreds of millions of dollars on the project. On May 31, 2017, the aircraft was rolled out for fueling tests, and to be prepared for ground testing, engine runs, taxi tests, and ultimately, first flight. The company stated that it was aiming for a 2019 first-launch demonstration. The Register newspaper in 2017 reported that Stratolaunch may have competition from the DARPA XS-1 or from Vector Space Systems by 2019. By September 2017, engine testing was underway as well as testing of "control surfaces and electric, pneumatic and fire detection systems." On January 9, 2019, Stratolaunch completed a  taxi test, and released a photograph of the nose landing gear lifted off the ground during the test.

In January 2019, three months after the death of Stratolaunch founder and Microsoft co-founder Paul Allen, Stratolaunch abandoned the development of its PGA rocket engines and dedicated launchers. Stratolaunch was then reported to be aiming for a first flight within a few weeks and a first launch from the carrier in 2020.

Development halt and sale 
The future of Stratolaunch had been in doubt since the death of company founder Paul Allen in October 2018, with speculation that Stratolaunch Systems could cease operations. Allen had been the source of funds for the capital-intensive development program since the project began in 2010, and the company founding in 2011.

In January 2019, Stratolaunch announced it was halting development of its air-launched family of launch vehicles.

On May 31, 2019, the company announced that it would cease operations and that sale of its assets was being explored. In June 2019 the Stratolaunch Systems company and assets were put up for sale by Vulcan for $400 million.

By October 11, Stratolaunch announced it had new ownership and that it would continue regular operations, but did not disclose the identity of the investors. In December, the new owner was revealed to be Cerberus Capital Management, a specialist in the acquisition of distressed companies. After the acquisition, Stratolaunch is now focusing on offering high-speed flight test services.

Post-ownership change
By early 2020, Stratolaunch was developing the Talon-A reusable, rocket-powered, hypersonic flight vehicle (the Vulcan Aerospace Hyper-A concept in 2018). It could be carried by the airplane from 2022, up to three at once from 2023, and a larger concept vehicle, the Talon-Z, could carry cargo or people to orbit. 

The Stratolaunch made its second flight on April 29, 2021. It made its fourth flight on February 24, 2022. It made its eighth flight on October 28, 2022.

Design 

The twin-fuselage configuration is similar to the Scaled Composites White Knight Two. Each fuselage has its own empennage.   

The pilot, co-pilot and flight engineer are accommodated in the right fuselage cockpit. The flight data systems are in the left fuselage. The left fuselage cockpit is unmanned with storage space for up to 2,500lb of mission specific support equipment. Both fuselage cockpits are pressurized and separated by a composite pressure bulkhead from the remainder of the unpressurized vehicle.

At , it is the largest plane by wingspan, greater than a  American football field. The main center section is made up of four primary composite spars supported by four secondary spars. The center section of the high-mounted, high aspect ratio wing is fitted with a Mating and Integration System (MIS), developed by Dynetics and capable of handling a  load. The wing houses six main and two auxiliary fuel tanks, with the main tanks located inboard adjacent to an engine. The auxiliary tanks are located in the inboard wing where the load-carrying structure joins the fuselage.

Stratolaunch is powered by six Pratt & Whitney PW4056 engines positioned on pylons outboard of each fuselage, providing  of thrust per engine. Many of the aircraft systems have been adopted from the Boeing 747-400, including the engines, avionics, flight deck, landing gear and other systems, reducing development costs.

The flight controls include 12 cable-driven ailerons powered by hydraulic actuators, split rudders, and horizontal stabilizers on twin tail units. The wing has 14 electrically signaled, hydraulically actuated trailing-edge split flaps that also act as speed brakes. The hydraulic system and actuators, electrical system, avionics, pilot controls, and flight deck are from donor B747-400s. Approximately 250,000 lb of the aircraft's takeoff weight of 1,300,000 lb is from B747-400 components.

It will require  of runway to lift-off. It will carry a  payload. It could launch a Dream Chaser small spaceplane capable of transporting astronauts or payloads within 24 hours. The stated goal is to carry up to three Orbital ATK "Pegasus XL" rockets for high-altitude launches by 2022.

Within Scaled Composites, its model number is M351. It is nicknamed "Roc" after Sinbad's Roc, the mythical bird so big it could carry an elephant.

Specifications (Model 351 Stratolaunch)

See also

References

External links

 Original Video – Animation of Stratolaunch with SpaceX Falcon 9 Air launch vehicle, December 2011.
 Stratolaunch First Flight, with landing, Stratolaunch Systems, April 2019.
 
 
 
 

Scaled Composites
Space tourism
Twin-fuselage aircraft
Air launch to orbit
Rutan aircraft
Space launch vehicles of the United States
Six-engined jet aircraft
High-wing aircraft
2010s United States special-purpose aircraft
Aircraft first flown in 2019
Stratolaunch